The year 2013 is the tenth year in the history of the Konfrontacja Sztuk Walki, a mixed martial arts promotion based in Poland. In 2014 Konfrontacja Sztuk Walki held 4 events beginning with,  KSW 22: Pride Time .

List of events

KSW 22: Pride Time

KSW 22: Pride Time was held at the Hala Torwar in Warsaw, Poland on March 16, 2013.

Background
The main event featured Polish standout Jan Błachowicz defending his Light Heavyweight Championship against UFC veteran Goran Reljic.

Results

KSW 23: Khalidov vs. Manhoef

KSW 23: Khalidov vs Manhoef was a mixed martial arts event held on June 8, 2013, at the Ergo Arena in Gdańsk, Poland.

Background

Konfrontacja Sztuk Walki's first Women's Champion was crowned at this event.

This was the first event available through ksw.tv outside of Poland.

Results

KSW 24: Clash of the Giants

KSW 24: Clash of the Giants was a mixed martial arts event held on September 28, 2013 at the Atlas Arena in Łódź, Poland.

Background

The main event saw Mariusz Pudzianowski against Sean McCorkle in a rematch.

The event also crowned the first heavyweight champion in a match between Pawel Nastula and Karol Bedorf.  The event also featured a rematch between Michal Materla and Jay Silva in the middleweight division. Mateusz Gamrot replaced current lightweight champion Maciej Jewtuszko as UFC veteran Andre Winner's opponent.

Results

KSW 25: Khalidov vs. Sakurai 2

KSW 25: Khalidov vs. Sakurai 2 was a mixed martial arts event held on December 7, 2013 at the Wroclaw Centennial Hall, Wroclaw, Poland.

Background

Results

References

 
2013 in mixed martial arts
Konfrontacja Sztuk Walki events
Konfrontacja Sztuk Walki events